SOS Kolkata is a 2020 Indian Bengali-language action thriller film written and directed by Anshuman Pratyush and produced by Jarek Entertainment and Pratyush Production. The film starring Yash Dasgupta, Mimi Chakraborty, Nusrat Jahan and Sabyasachi Chakraborty is about a suspected terrorist attack and how the army, police and the common people come together to save lives and work against wrongdoings. The filming resumed on 6 July 2020, after lockdown due to the pandemic.

The film was released in theatres on 21 October 2020, coinciding with Puja hoildays. The production of the film was delayed due to the COVID-19 pandemic. It got mixed reviews, but with properness, it is being negatively reviewed.

Synopsis
Half a dozen jihadis, led by terrorist Aftab Ansari(Amin Gazi), have entered Kolkata to avenge the Mumbai attacks. Aftab has a personal grudge against Special Task Force leader Zakir Ahmed (Yash Dasgupta). Aftab masterminds a series of attacks in Kolkata, ending in a hostage situation in the premises of a 5-star hotel, JW Marriott. Zakir Ahmed, who had lost his wife, Sanjana (Mimi Chakraborty), in an attack by Aftab, is on the scene with ATS technical head Amanda Jones (Nusrat Jahan) to conduct a rescue operation and arrest the jihadis.

Cast
 Yash Dasgupta as ATS officer Zakir Ahmed
 Mimi Chakraborty as Sanjana, Zakir's wife
 Nusrat Jahan as ATS officer and Zakir's colleague Amanda Jones
 Amin Gazi as Aftab Ansari,a terrorist
 Ena Saha as Angel D'Souza, manager of Chariott Hotel
 Sabyasachi Chakraborty as Raghav Sen, Senior Security Advisor and ISI agent
 Shantilal Mukherjee as retired army general Matthew Henriques
 Rupa Bhattacharya as IPS Nandita Roy
 Sudip Mukherjee as ATS chief

Promotion and release
The promotional campaign was launched on 2 October 2020, with the unlock guidelines for the opening of theatres set in by MOH, the film promotion started with the release of a teaser.

The film is scheduled to be released in theatres on 21 October 2020, coinciding with Puja hoildays.

Soundtrack

The soundtrack of the film is composed by Savvy - Pratik Kundu and lyrics by 
Pratik Kundu and Ritam. The song "Thik Bhul Bhule Aam" from soundtrack is melodious. Anwesha Dutta Gupta's rendition of the song on composition by Savvy and Pratik Kundu is soulful.

Reception

Critical response

Upam Buzarbaruah, writing for The Times of India gave three stars out of five and termed it as "An unimpressive combination of action and drama." Buzarbaruah opined that in spite of the weak script team SOS Kolkata has put up a decent show. He praised acting, music and the special effects, but was critical that research and character sketches were not given due importance.  He concluded the review with the remark, "Overall, SOS Kolkata is a one-time watch at best."

References

External links
 

2020 films
Bengali-language Indian films
2020s Bengali-language films
Film productions suspended due to the COVID-19 pandemic
Films postponed due to the COVID-19 pandemic
Indian action thriller films
Films about terrorism
Films about terrorism in India
Fictional portrayals of police departments in India
2020 action thriller films